Zulhadi Omar, also known as Eddie Teyo, is a Malaysian handyman and sales executive. He was born on 17 July 1978 at the Batu Pahat Hospital in Johor. Due to a hospital mix-up following erroneous switch at birth, he was wrongly recorded born as a Malay Muslim of couple Omar Saim and Hasnah Salleh, while in fact he is the biological son of Chinese and Buddhist parent Teyo Ma Liong (or Teo Ma Liong) and Lim Sik Hai as confirmed in a DNA test. He is known for his many lawsuits against Malaysia in a bid to officially change faith from Islam to Buddhism.

References

Bibliography
 

Living people
1978 births
Johor
Malaysian people of Chinese descent
Malaysian Buddhists
Converts to Buddhism from Islam
Malaysian former Muslims
Former Muslims
Converts to Buddhism
Islam-related controversies in Asia